Events in the year 1925 in India.

Incumbents
 Emperor of India – George V
 Viceroy of India – The Earl of Reading

Events
 National income - 31,179 million
 3 February – The first ever electric train of India completes its journey from Victoria Terminus to Kurla on the Central Line (Mumbai Suburban Railway).
 9 March – 1 May Pink's War; RAF operations against tribesmen in Waziristan 
 27 September - Rashtriya Swayamsevak Sangh is founded. 
 26 December – Communist Party of India is founded at Kanpur.
 Dyarchy suspended in Bengal.

Law
Indian Succession Act
Indian Carriage of Goods by Sea Act
Sikh Gurdwaras (Supplementary) Act
Indian Soldiers (Litigation) Act
Provident Funds Act
Coal Grading Board Act
Cotton Ginning and Pressing Factories Act

Births
 1 January – Wahiduddin Khan, religious scholar and peace activist (died  2021)
 19 January – Pradeep Kumar, actor (died 2001)
 25 January – Kakarla Subba Rao, radiologist (died 2021)
 8 May – G. S. Amur, writer and critic (died 2020)
 9 July – Guru Dutt, film director, producer, and actor (died 1964)
 22 July – Daasarathi Krishnamacharyulu, poet and political activist (died 1987)
 7 August – M. S. Swaminathan, agricultural scientist
 31 August – Aarudhra, author, poet and historian (died 1998)
 4 November – Ritwik Ghatak, film director (died 1976)
 29 December – Keshav Dutt, hockey player (died 2021)

Full date unknown
 Raja Ramanna, nuclear scientist (died 2004)

Deaths
Gokulchandra Nag, writer and artist (born 1895).

References

 
India
Years of the 20th century in India